The 2006 National Indoor Football League season was the fifth season of the National Indoor Football League (NIFL). The league champions were the Billings Outlaws, who defeated the Fayetteville Guard in Indoor Bowl VI.

Standings

 Green indicates clinched playoff berth
 Purple indicates division champion
 Grey indicates best conference record

Playoffs

* – forfeit

See also
 List of NIFL seasons

External links
 2006 NIFL Season Standings
 2006 NIFL Summary

National Indoor Football League seasons
National Indoor Football League Season, 2006